Revolutionary Workers' and Peasants' Party of Turkey (TİİKP) was a Maoist communist party in Turkey. The chairman of TİİKP was Doğu Perinçek. TİİKP was an illegal party.

In 1972, İbrahim Kaypakkaya and others broke with TİİKP and formed  ("Communist Party of Turkey (Marxist-Leninist)").

TİKP later became a legal party and became  ("Socialist Party" or SP). In 1992,  ("Workers' Party" or İP) was formed as a continuation of TİKP and SP. In 2015 Workers' Party changed its name to Patriotic Party.

See also 
 List of illegal political parties in Turkey

References 

Defunct Maoist parties
Political parties established in 1971
Defunct communist parties in Turkey
Banned political parties in Turkey
Banned communist parties
Economic history of Turkey
Maoist organizations in Turkey